Betar may refer to:

 In Hebrew (ביתר):
 Betar (ancient village), an ancient Jewish town and the last standing stronghold of the Bar Kokhba revolt. Several nearby modern locations bear its name:
 Battir, a Palestinian Arab village in the West Bank and the site of ancient Betar's remains  
 Beitar Illit, a city in the Judea and Samaria Area
 Mevo Beitar, Jerusalem area town
 Betar, a Revisionist Zionist youth movement
 Beitar Jerusalem F.C., a Jerusalem-based Football Club
 Beitar Tel Aviv F.C., a Tel Aviv-based Football Club in existence until the end of the 1990s
 Betar Naval Academy

 In Bengali (বেতার):
 Bangladesh Betar, the state-owned radio broadcaster in Bangladesh
 Betar Bangla,  British radio station based in London aimed at the Bangladeshi community

People
 Ricky Betar (born 2003), Australian Paralympic swimmer
 Timothy John Betar (born 1990), American youtuber

See also
 
 Batar (disambiguation)